Grizzlies may refer to:

Grizzly bears

Sports
 Sports teams named after the grizzly bear
United States:
 Memphis Grizzlies, a National Basketball Association team in Memphis, Tennessee
 Fresno Grizzlies, a Triple-A minor league baseball team based in Fresno, California
 Gateway Grizzlies, a professional baseball team based in Sauget, Illinois
 An informal name for the Memphis Southmen, a team in the former World Football League
 Fairbanks Grizzlies, a professional Indoor Football League team from Fairbanks, Alaska
 Seattle Grizzlies, an Australian Football League team based in Seattle, Washington
 Utah Grizzlies, an ice hockey team from West Valley City, Utah
 High Country Grizzlies, an AAL and NAL team in Boone, NC
 Utah Grizzlies (1995–2005), an ice hockey team based in Salt Lake City, Utah, later relocated and renamed
 Montana Grizzlies, the college sports teams of the University of Montana, Missoula
 the sports teams of Franklin College (Indiana)
 Northside Grizzlies, the sports teams of Northside High School, Fort Smith, Arkansas

Canada:
 Vancouver Grizzlies, a National Basketball Association team that played from 1995 to 2001 before relocating to Memphis
 Vancouver Grizzlies (football), a Canadian football team that played in Vancouver in 1941
 Olds Grizzlys, a Canadian ice hockey team in the Alberta Junior Hockey League

Germany:
 Ansbach Grizzlies, an American football team based in Ansbach

Other uses
 The Grizzlies, a 2018 Canadian sports drama film